Ty L. Howard (born November 30, 1973) is a former professional American football cornerback in the National Football League. He played four seasons for the Arizona Cardinals (1997–1998), the Cincinnati Bengals (1999), and Tennessee Titans (2000).

1973 births
Living people
Players of American football from Columbus, Ohio
American football cornerbacks
Ohio State Buckeyes football players
Arizona Cardinals players
Cincinnati Bengals players
Tennessee Titans players